Leopard Creek is a stream located entirely within San Miguel County, Colorado.

According to tradition, the sighting of a leopard near the creek accounts for the name.

See also
List of rivers of Colorado

References

Rivers of San Miguel County, Colorado
Rivers of Colorado